Cymothoe heliada is a butterfly in the family Nymphalidae. It is found in Nigeria, Cameroon, the Republic of the Congo and the Democratic Republic of the Congo. The habitat consists of forests.

The larvae feed on Rinorea species.

Subspecies
Cymothoe heliada heliada (Nigeria: Cross River loop, Cameroon, Congo)
Cymothoe heliada liberatorum Overlaet, 1952 (Democratic Republic of the Congo: central to Sankuru)
Cymothoe heliada mutshindji Overlaet, 1940 (Democratic Republic of the Congo: Lualaba, Kabinda)

References

Butterflies described in 1874
Cymothoe (butterfly)
Butterflies of Africa
Taxa named by William Chapman Hewitson